Coleophora zagella is a moth of the family Coleophoridae found in Mongolia.

References

zagella
Moths described in 1972
Moths of Asia